Among the Ghosts is the tenth studio album by American country-punk band Lucero. It was released August 3, 2018 under Thirty Tigers.

Production
The album was recorded live at Phillips Recording with producer Matt Ross-Spang. American actor Michael Shannon features on "Back to the Night". The track "Loving" features on the 2016 film, Loving

Critical reception
Among the Ghosts was met with "generally favorable" reviews from critics. At Metacritic, which assigns a weighted average rating out of 100 to reviews from mainstream publications, this release received an average score of 77, based on 7 reviews. Aggregator Album of the Year gave the release a 74 out of 100 based on a critical consensus of 4 reviews.

Mark Deming of AllMusic said the album "demonstrates how smart and versatile these guys can be; it's a brave and satisfying set that finds beauty and meaning in the valleys on the human experience." Eric Danton from Paste said of the album: "The songs are full of minor-key acoustic guitars, moody electric flourishes and downhearted piano parts, augmented here and there with overdriven, but restrained, riffs."

Accolades

Track listing

Personnel

Musicians
 Ben Nichols – vocals, guitar
 Rick Steff – piano
 John C. Stubblefield – bass
 Brian Venable – guitar
 Roy Berry – drums
 Eugenio Figueroa – viola
 Heather Trussell – violin
 Gaylon Patterson – violin
 Dara Hankins – cello
 Jim Spake – saxophone
 Michael Shannon – vocals

Production
 Matt Ross-Spang – engineer, mixing, producer
 Wesley Graham – engineer
 Jeff Powell – mastering
 Alex McCollough – mastering
 Matthew Cole – design

Charts

References

2018 albums
Lucero (band) albums
Thirty Tigers albums